Chukhray is a Russian surname. Notable people with this surname include:

 Grigory Chukhray (1921–2001), Soviet film director and screenwriter
 Pavel Chukhray (born 1946), Russian screenwriter and film director
 Sergei Chukhray (born 1955), Soviet canoeist

See also